René Gérard may refer to:

 René Gérard (footballer), French footballer
 René Gérard (cyclist), French racing cyclist
 René Gérard (propagandist), French WWII anti-Semitic propagandist

See also
 René Girard, French polymath, historian, literary critic, and philosopher of social science